Pinguy OS is a discontinued free Linux distribution for x86-based PCs, based on Ubuntu.

General info 
Pinguy OS is an Ubuntu-based distribution with many applications and tweaks installed by default. Such software includes ZRam and Preload.

According to Distrowatch.com Pinguy OS "features numerous user-friendly enhancements, out-of-the-box support for multimedia codecs and browser plugins, a heavily tweaked GNOME user interface with enhanced menus, panels and dockbars, and a selection of popular desktop applications for many common computing tasks."

Although the distribution comes with many pre-installed applications, browser plugins, multimedia codecs and system utilities, many users could perceive this as unnecessary bloat, given that Ubuntu and many of its descendants come with a lot of useful software as well, without retaining a large memory and storage footprint.

Features 
The following features are found in the Pinguy OS distribution:

 Installation: Graphical (GUI)
 Default Desktop: modified GNOME 3 (as of 14.04)
 Package Management: DEB (Ubuntu Software Center and Synaptic Package Manager installed)
 Processor Architecture: i686, x86-64
 Journaled File Systems: ext3, ext4, JFS, ReiserFS, XFS
 Multilingual: Yes

Release history 
The following is the release history for Pinguy OS.

Beta: The 6 month Pinguy OS releases will be missing features that will be in the final LTS, but the release will be very usable.

Availability 
Pinguy OS is also available in 32-bit and 64-bit versions.

References

External links 

 
 

Linux distributions
Ubuntu derivatives
X86-64 Linux distributions